The Women's 100 metres T12 event at the 2016 Summer Paralympics took place at the Estádio Olímpico João Havelange on 8 and 9 September. It features 15 athletes from 11 countries.

Results

Heats
Qualification rule: The winner of each heat (Q) and the next four fastest (q) qualify for the semifinals.

Heat 1

Heat 2

Heat 3

Heat 4

Semifinals

Qualification rule: The winner of each semifinal (Q) and the next two fastest (q) qualify for the final.

Semifinal 1

Semifinal 2

Final

References

Women's